"América América" is a song written by José Luis Armenteros and Pablo Herrero and performed by Spanish performer Nino Bravo. It was released as a single for his fifth studio album y volumen 5 (1973). The song reached number one on the Spanish Singles Chart in 1973. In 2013, the song was inducted into the Latin Grammy Hall of Fame.

Luis Miguel version

In 1992, Mexican recording artist Luis Miguel covered "América América" on his live extended play (EP) América & En Vivo. The song peaked at number 20 on the Billboard Hot Latin Songs chart. The music video for "América América" was filmed across several locations in the United States and Puerto Rico. Miguel dedicated the song to the soldiers who participated in the Gulf War. The music video won the Viewer's Choice award for MTV Internacional at the 1993 MTV Video Music Awards and received a nomination for Video of the Year at the 5th Annual Lo Nuestro Awards in the same year.

Weekly charts

See also
List of number-one singles of 1973 (Spain)
List of number-one hits of 1992 (Mexico)

References

1973 songs
1973 singles
1992 singles
Latin Grammy Hall of Fame Award recipients
Luis Miguel songs
Nino Bravo songs
Number-one singles in Spain
PolyGram singles
Songs about South America
Spanish-language songs
Warner Music Latina singles
Songs about Central America
Songs about North America